The Way of the Vaselines: A Complete History is a compilation album by the indie rock band The Vaselines. It was released in May 1992 on Sub Pop Records, catalogue SP145b. The album compiles every previous release by the band, the two EP's Son of a Gun and Dying For It, as well as their first long-playing album Dum-Dum, in chronological order of release. Three additional tracks are included: "Dying for It (The Blues)", "Let's Get Ugly", and the previously unreleased "Bitch."

The band had broken up around the time that Dum-Dum was issued, and had never gained a huge following. However, covers of their songs by Nirvana had brought them new exposure, which prompted Sub Pop to put together this compilation. Production credits are to The Vaselines in collaboration with Stephen Pastel on the tracks from Son of A Gun and Dying for It, and with Jamie Watson on the remainder.

Critical reception
Entertainment Weekly wrote that "in The Way of the Vaselines: A Complete History, these recovering Catholics tackle subjects as complex as atheism and murder and as mundane as a particularly chafing bike seat, all with lyrics so simple a 6-year-old could have written them." Pitchfork said, "The 19-track collection that Sub Pop released at Cobain's suggestion has long been the best way to listen in on Kelly and McKee's flirty chaos." Robert Christgau called it, "one of those punk miracles that makes you think anyone can do it".

Track listing
All songs by Eugene Kelly and Frances McKee except "You Think You're a Man" by Geoff Deane.

 "Son of a Gun" – 3:46
 "Rory Rides Me Raw" – 2:28
 "You Think You're a Man" – 5:43
 "Dying for It" – 2:22
 "Molly's Lips" – 1:44
 "Teenage Superstars" – 3:28
 "Jesus Wants Me for a Sunbeam" – 3:31
 "Sex Sux (Amen)" – 3:10
 "Slushy" – 2:00
 "Monsterpussy" – 1:43
 "Bitch" – 2:42
 "No Hope" – 3:21
 "Oliver Twisted" – 2:49
 "The Day I Was a Horse" – 1:29
 "Dum-Dum" – 1:57
 "Hairy" – 1:48
 "Lovecraft" – 5:37
 "Dying for It (The Blues)" – 3:09
 "Let's Get Ugly" – 2:19

Personnel
 Eugene Kelly — vocals, guitars. harmonica
 Frances McKee — vocals, guitars, synthesizer on "You Think You're A Man"
 James Seenan — bass
 Charlie Kelly — drums

Additional personnel
 Aggi Wright — keyboards on "Son of A Gun"
 David Keegan — lead guitar on "Dying for It"
 Sophie Pragnell — viola on "Jesus Doesn't Want Me for A Sunbeam", "Dying for It" and "Oliver Twisted"
 Jamie Watson — slide guitar on "Bitch," "The Day I Was A Horse," and "Dying for It (The Blues)"
 Stephen Pastel — production, additional guitar. backing vocals on "You Think You're A Man" 
 Gordon Rintoul, Ian Beveridge, Peter Haigh, Jamie Watson — engineers
 Jane Higgins — design

References 

The Vaselines albums
1992 compilation albums
Sub Pop compilation albums